Bogusławki may refer to the following places:
Bogusławki, Gostyń County in Greater Poland Voivodeship (west-central Poland)
Bogusławki, Środa Wielkopolska County in Greater Poland Voivodeship (west-central Poland)
Bogusławki, Kuyavian-Pomeranian Voivodeship (north-central Poland)